Berndt Carlsson (7 April 1907 – 30 June 1991) was a Swedish cyclist. He competed in the individual and team road race events at the 1936 Summer Olympics.

References

External links
 

1907 births
1991 deaths
Swedish male cyclists
Olympic cyclists of Sweden
Cyclists at the 1936 Summer Olympics
People from Ödeshög Municipality
Sportspeople from Östergötland County